The James J. Corbett Memorial Award is a US award given annually by the National Association of Collegiate Directors of Athletics (NACDA).  It is presented "to the collegiate administrator who through the years has most typified Corbett's devotion to intercollegiate athletics and worked unceasingly for its betterment."  The award is named after former Louisiana State University athletics director and first president of the NACDA, James J. Corbett.  It has been presented annually since 1967.

Winners
The following individuals have won the Corbett Award.

References

College sports trophies and awards in the United States
Awards established in 1967